Baher Mohamed Moursi El Mohamady (born 26 December 1996), is an Egyptian footballer who plays for Egyptian Premier League side Ismaily and the Egyptian national team as a defender.

El Mohamady is a player of the Ismaily youth system. He earned his first international cap against Niger on 8 September 2018.

International statistics

International
Statistics accurate as of match played 7 November 2019.Egypt score listed first, score column indicates score after each El Mohamady goal.''

References

1996 births
Living people
People from Ismailia
Egyptian footballers
Egypt international footballers
Association football defenders
Egyptian Premier League players
Ismaily SC players
Zamalek SC players
2019 Africa Cup of Nations players